The 2000 Nobel Prize in Literature was awarded to the Chinese émigré writer Gao Xingjian (born 1940) "for an æuvre of universal validity, bitter insights and linguistic ingenuity, which has opened new paths for the Chinese novel and drama." He is the first Chinese recipient of the prize followed by Mo Yan in 2012.

Laureate

The fusion of traditional Chinese literature and theater with a Western and modernist style is a defining feature of Gao Xingjian's writing. He traveled to southern and southwestern China while facing greater persecution from the Chinese government, and these experiences served as the inspiration for the 1999 novel Língshān ("Soul Mountain"). It is a mash-up of literary styles and genres with accounts of individuals Gao encountered on the road, including monks, folk singers, a victim of the Cultural Revolution, and others. His other celebrated works of fiction are Gěi wǒ lǎoyé mǎi yú gān ("Buying a Fishing Rod for My Grandfather", 1986–1990) and Yīgèrén de shèngjīng ("One Man's Bible", 1999). He is also a noted translator of various plays particularly of Samuel Beckett and Eugène Ionesco.

Reactions
Gao Xingjian was seen as a surprise choice. In Sweden, it was widely expected that the better-known poet and dissident writer Bei Dao, who had been published in the Swedish royal academy's cultural magazine publication Artes for many years, would become the first Chinese Nobel Prize laureate in literature. Internationally the choice of Gao Xingjian was heavily criticized. The professor of Chinese history and literature at University of Canberra, Geremie Barmé, called it "a comical masterpiece", while saying he was happy that a Chinese writer, "even an uneven and mediocre" one, had finally been awarded the prize. Respected literature critic Thomas Steinfeld, chief editor of literature at the German newspaper Frankfurter Allgemeine Zeitung expressed a feeling of humiliation that the prize had been awarded to an author unknown to them. In China,  the news that the dissident writer Gao Xingjian had been awarded the Nobel Prize in Literature was first met with silence in Chinese media, then Gao Xingjian was condemned.

Nobel lecture
On December 7, 2000, Gao Xingjian delivered his Nobel Lecture at the Swedish Academy in the Chinese language, the second in such language after Samuel C. C. Ting. His lecture was entitled The Case for Literature.

Controversy
Gao Xingjian's Swedish translator Göran Malmqvist, was a member of the Swedish Academy and was responsible for the translation to Swedish for Nobel Prize consideration. Ten days before the award decision was made public, Gao Xingjian changed his Swedish publisher (from Forum to Atlantis), but Göran Malmqvist has denied leaking information about the award.

References

External links
2000 Prize announcement nobelprize.org
Award ceremony speech nobelprize.org

2000